To byl český muzikant is a 1940 Czechoslovak film. The film starred Josef Kemr.

References

External links
 

1940 films
1940s Czech-language films
Czech musical drama films
Czechoslovak black-and-white films
Czechoslovak musical drama films
1940s musical drama films
1940 drama films
1940s Czech films